Boron is a town in north-central Ivory Coast. It is a sub-prefecture of Dikodougou Department in Poro Region, Savanes District. The town sits just northeast of the border of Woroba District.

Boron was a commune until March 2012, when it became one of 1126 communes nationwide that were abolished.

In 2014, the population of the sub-prefecture of Boron was 24,239.

Villages
The 6 villages of the sub-prefecture of Boron and their population in 2014 are:
 Bissidougou (2 309)
 Boron (6 135)
 Farakoro (3 270)
 Gbondougou (2 294)
 Marha (5 502)
 Ouattaradougou (4 729)

Notes

Sub-prefectures of Poro Region
Former communes of Ivory Coast